Achso is an EP by Ricardo Villalobos. It was released in December 2005 on double LP vinyl by Cadenza Records. The album title and song titles are a wordplay in stylised German, "achso" meaning "oh" and "ichso", "duso", "erso" & "sieso" meaning roughly "I was like", "you were like", "he was like" & "she was like".

Track listing
CD pressing

Vinyl pressing

References

2005 EPs
Ricardo Villalobos albums